Gudbrand Granum (19 September 1893 – 11 February 1984) was a Norwegian politician for the Communist Party.

He served as a deputy representative to the Parliament of Norway from Buskerud during the term 1945–1949. He hailed from Modum and had first been elected to the municipal council in 1922.

References

1893 births
1984 deaths
People from Modum
Deputy members of the Storting
Communist Party of Norway politicians
Buskerud politicians